Constantin Frommann (born 27 May 1998) is a German professional footballer who most recently played as a goalkeeper for 3. Liga club SV Meppen.

Club career

SC Freiburg 
At the age of twelve, Frommann moved from his home club SV Oberachern to the youth academy of SC Freiburg. In 2017, he made his debut in the Regionalliga Südwest for SC Freiburg II, the reserve team of Freiburg, with whom he had previously enjoyed promotion from the Oberliga Baden-Württemberg without making any appearances. In the 2018–19 season, Frommann was part of the professional first team squad of SC Freiburg.

Loan to Sonnenhof Großaspach 
For the 2019–20 season, the goalkeeper was sent on loan to 3. Liga club SG Sonnenhof Großaspach. On the matchday 8, Frommann was given preference over regular goalkeeper Maximilian Reule in a match against Bayern Munich II and made his debut in professional football. The rest of the season, he was mostly a backup to Reule, as Sonnenhof Großaspach suffered relegation by finishing in the penultimate spot in the league table. Upon his return to Freiburg, he was not a part of the club's future plans, and in early October 2020 his contract was terminated shortly before the transfer window was closed. At the same time, he received the offer to continue training with Freiburg until he found a new club.

SV Meppen
In mid-November 2020, Frommann signed a contract with 3. Liga club SV Meppen, valid until the summer of 2022, after regular keepers Luca Plogmann and Matthis Harsman had suffered injuries. In May 2022, it was announced that his expiring contract would not be extended, making him a free agent after the season.

International career 
On 12 November 2013, Frommann made his debut for the Germany national under-16 team. Since then, he played in all of the German Football Association national youth teams up to the U20. At the 2015 UEFA European Under-17 Championship, he started in the final (1–4 loss to France) and was elected to the team of the tournament. For his achievements, he was also awarded the bronze U-17 Fritz Walter Medal.

Honours
Germany U17
UEFA European Under-17 Championship runner-up: 2015

Individual
 Fritz Walter Medal U17 Bronze: 2015
 2015 UEFA European Under-17 Championship Team of the Tournament

References

Living people
1998 births
German footballers
Association football goalkeepers
Germany youth international footballers
SC Freiburg II players
SC Freiburg players
SG Sonnenhof Großaspach players
SV Meppen players
3. Liga players
Regionalliga players